Gruel is a food consisting of some type of cereal—such as ground oats, wheat, rye, or rice—heated or boiled in water or milk. It is a thinner version of porridge that may be more often drunk rather than eaten. Historically, gruel has been a staple of the Western diet, especially for peasants. Gruel may be made from millet, hemp, barley, or, in hard times, from chestnut flour or even the less bitter acorns of some oaks. Gruel has historically been associated with feeding the sick and recently weaned children.

Gruel is also a colloquial expression for any watery food of unknown character, e.g., pea soup. Gruel has often been associated with poverty, with negative associations attached to the term in popular culture, as in the Charles Dickens novels Oliver Twist and A Christmas Carol.

History
Gruel was the staple food of the ancient Greeks, for whom roasted meats were the extraordinary feast that followed sacrifice, even among heroes, and "In practice, bread was a luxury eaten only in towns". Roman plebeians "ate the staple gruel of classical times, supplemented by oil, the humbler vegetables and salt fish", for gruel could be prepared without access to the communal ovens in which bread was baked. In the Middle Ages, the peasant could avoid the tithe exacted by paying in grain ground by the miller of the landowner's mill. When eaten by the peasant, the process was to roast the grains to make them digestible, and grind small portions in a mortar at home. In lieu of cooking the resulting paste on the hearthstone, it could be simmered in a cauldron with water or, luxuriously, with milk.

In the Americas, maize gruels were once one of the main food sources for many Mesoamerican peoples, such as the Maya and Aztecs. Atole is a preparation of ground maize often flavored with chili and salt (for a savory dish), or, in more modern times, with piloncillo and cinnamon (for a sweet dish). It can be consumed as an important calorie source as a thicker meal, or and as a liquid drink.

Gruel was on the third-class menu of the Titanic on the eve of her sinking in April 1912.

Variations 

In many Spanish-speaking countries, several gruels are made; the masa-based drink or spoonable food called atole or atol de elote is a staple throughout Central America, served hot. It can range in consistency from a thin cloudy drink to a thicker porridge-like food. Horchata is a chilled sweetened drink of similar nature to thin atole. It is made from ground nutmeats or seeds, grains (often rice) and seasonings such as vanilla and cinnamon, served over ice.

Rice gruels eaten throughout Asia are normally referred to in English as porridge as opposed to gruel. Common forms include congee, from the Tamil word for the food and most common in China, Japanese okayu, Korean dak juk, and Vietnamese cháo. Asian porridges/gruels are typically savory, with meat or vegetables added and stock sometimes used as the liquid cooking element.

Etymology
The Oxford English Dictionary gives an etymology of Middle English  from the same word in Old French, both of them deriving from a source in Late Latin: , a diminutive, as the form of the word demonstrates, possibly from an Old Frankish , surmised on the basis of a modern cognate grout. In modern Dutch, the plural word "grutten" still refers to de-husked,  coarse ground grain and a traditional dish based on pearlbarley and blackberry is called watergruwel.

The Old Norse word , meaning "coarse-ground grain", gives way to the Icelandic grautur, Faroese greytur, Norwegian grøt (nynorsk graut), Danish grød, and the Swedish and Elfdalian gröt, all meaning porridge, of which gruel is a subtype.

The German "Grießmehl", ground grain, and Dutch "griesmeel", are compounded cognates to the English grist and mill.

In fiction

In the English-speaking world, gruel is remembered as the food of the child workhouse inmates in Charles Dickens's Industrial Revolution novel Oliver Twist (1838); the workhouse was supplied with "an unlimited supply of water" and "small quantities of oatmeal". When Oliver asks the master of the workhouse for some more, he is struck a blow on the head for doing so. The "small saucepan of gruel" waiting upon Ebenezer Scrooge's hob in Dickens's 1843 novel A Christmas Carol emphasizes how miserly Scrooge is. Gruel is also Mr. Woodhouse's preferred and offered dish in Jane Austen's Emma (1816) often to comic or sympathetic effect. References to gruel in popular culture today continue to refer to miserly or starvation conditions, such as Gemma Collins in Celebrity Big Brother 17 (2016), who was denied food for gruel.

References

External links
 Ask Mr Breakfast — What is gruel and did orphans really eat it?
Titanic Food Menu

Porridges
Staple foods
Ancient dishes
Peasant food